The 1956 Michigan gubernatorial election was held on November 6, 1956. Incumbent Democrat G. Mennen Williams defeated Republican nominee Albert E. Cobo with 54.65% of the vote.

General election

Candidates
Major party candidates
G. Mennen Williams, Democratic 
Albert E. Cobo, Republican

Other candidates
Alfred T. Halsted, Prohibition

Results

Primaries 
The primary elections occurred on August 7, 1956.

Democratic primary

Republican primary

References

1956
Michigan
Gubernatorial
November 1956 events in the United States